Donald K. Edler (November 9, 1922 – April 20, 1999) was an American sailor. He won the 1964 Star World Championships together with his son Kent D. Edler. He also finished second in the 1960 edition.

References

American male sailors (sport)
Star class sailors
Star class world champions
World champions in sailing for the United States
1922 births
1999 deaths